The National Symphony Orchestra of Ukraine (Ukrainian: Національний Симфонічний Оркестр України) is one of the principal orchestras of Ukraine.

It was founded in 1918 as Ukrainian State Symphony Orchestra. Nathan Rachlin conducted the orchestra from 1937 until 1962. Subsequent directors included Stephan Turchak, Volodymyr Kozhukhar, Fyodor Glushchenko, and Igor Blazhkov. The American conductor Theodore Kuchar is the current artistic director, while the chief conductor has been Volodymyr Sirenko since 1999.

The orchestra was on tour in cities across the United States in 2017.

References

Ukrainian orchestras
Musical groups established in 1918
Ukrainian classical music groups